The Canadian Dairy Commission (French: Commission canadienne du lait) is an Ottawa-based Government of Canada Crown Corporation that plays a role of administrator, facilitator and stakeholder in the public policy related to the Canadian dairy industry. The CDC's mandate is to coordinate dairy policies in a jurisdiction that is shared between both provincial and federal governments. In the early 1970s, when the dairy industry became the first industry in Canada to be operated under the national supply management system, the CDC was named as facilitator and administrator coordinating dairy policies and providing a framework for the management of the Canadian dairy industry.

Mandate
The CDC coordinates dairy policies in a jurisdiction that is shared between both provincial and federal governments. In its role as stakeholder and facilitator, the CDC provides a framework for the management of the Canadian dairy industry. The CDC's mandate was to ensure producers received a fair return on investment, and to ensure the quality and supply of milk. In 2020, Dalhousie and Guelph Universities united to provide a strategic roadmap to support Canada's dairy sector, called Supply management 2.0. One of recommendations of the report was to make significant changes to the Canadian Dairy Commission.

Its analogue is the poultry industry is the Farm Products Council of Canada.

Legislation
The 1967 Canadian Dairy Commission Act (1966–1967) established the Canadian Dairy Commission (CDC). National agencies were authorized to establish the national supply management system under the 1972 Farm Products Agencies Act.

History
The Canadian federal government has been active in its support of the Canadian dairy industry since 1890, when the first Dominion Dairy Commissioner, was appointed.

In 1967 the Canadian Dairy Commission Act (1966–1967) was passed which established the Canadian Dairy Commission (CDC).

In the early 1970s, the dairy industry became the first in Canada to be operated through the national supply management system.

The Canadian Milk Supply Management Committee was established in 1970. This committee was responsible for setting the national Market Sharing Quota.

Administration
The Minister of Agriculture and Agri-food is responsible for the Canadian Dairy Commission.

One of the CDC's mandates is to "ensure the quality and supply of milk".

Supply management
Since the supply management system was put into place, the CDC has been responsible for dairy support prices and market sharing quotas. Canada's supply management system "coordinates production and demand while controlling imports as a means of setting stable prices for both farmers and consumers."

The CDC also chairs the Canadian Milk Supply Management Committee, which coordinates the management of industrial milk supplies in Canada.

Support prices for raw milk
Once a year, after consultation with industry stakeholders, the CDC sets the support price for support price of butter. Provincial marketing boards then use these prices as references to determine the price of raw or industrial milk in each province. The CDC oversees the removal from the market of surplus butterfat for export or later sale.

National production target for Canada
In the early 1970s, dairy became the first commodity in Canada to operate a national supply management system. The CDC acts as a facilitator in the setting of the national milk production target for Canada, known as Total Quota. On behalf of the industry, the Canadian Dairy Commission calculates the Total Quota on a monthly basis, according to a method set by the Canadian Milk Supply Management Committee. This target is expressed in kilograms of butterfat, and is monitored on an ongoing basis and adjusted as needed to reflect variations in supply and demand. The national quota is allocated among regional pools. Each regional pool divides its share of the total quota among producers, in keeping with its own policies and according to pooling agreements.

The Total Quota is based on Total Requirements, and includes the quota for fluid milk and the quota for industrial milk. It also includes the milk necessary for programs aiming to stimulate market growth.

Programs

In its role as both administrator and facilitator, the CDC manages several programs on behalf of the industry.

The Special Milk Class Permit Program
The Special Milk Class Permit Program sets a competitive price for raw or industrial milk sold to milk processors based on its end use.

Domestic Seasonality Programs
In collaboration with the private sector, the CDC monitors the seasonal domestic supply of milk to maintain a balance between supply and demand through its Domestic Seasonality Programs.

Dairy Innovation Program
The CDC's Dairy Innovation Program promotes the creation of innovative dairy products for domestic consumption.

Dairy Marketing Program
CDC's marketing arms promotes consumer awareness of dairy products and ingredients produced in Canada.

Milk Access for Growth
The Milk Access for Growth program guarantees a sufficient supply of milk (whole or skim) to manufacture products that will grow total market demand. In March 2019, the CDC decided to put a moratorium on new applications. The program is being evaluated to ensure its relevance in future years.

Matching Investment Fund
The Canadian Dairy Commission (CDC) remains committed to supporting an environment that encourages growth and innovation in the manufacture and use of Canadian dairy products and ingredients. The Matching Investment Fund is designed to help eligible companies and Food Technology Centres with product development initiatives that help stimulate demand for Canadian dairy products and ingredients.

Storage Assistance for Cheese Program
The main objective of the SAC program is to encourage cheese manufacturers to produce various types of cheese (fresh or frozen), aged cheeses and rennet casein for the domestic market during periods of the year when milk supply exceeds domestic requirements, as determined by Provincial milk marketing boards or agencies.

References

External links
 
Canadian Dairy Information Centre (CDIC)

Agriculture and Agri-Food Canada
Agricultural organizations based in Canada
Canadian federal Crown corporations
Dairy farming in Canada
Dairy organizations
Federal departments and agencies of Canada